Alfred Jones (1900 - 1959) was a footballer who played in The Football League for Wrexham, where he spent twelve years.

He was a cousin of Dixie Dean.

References 

English footballers
Wrexham A.F.C. players
English Football League players
1900 births
1959 deaths
Association football defenders